Walker Payne is a 2006 film directed and co-written by Matt Williams and starring Jason Patric, Drea de Matteo, KaDee Strickland, Sam Shepard and Bruce Dern. It was shown at the Tribeca Film Festival on April 27, 2006.

Plot
The license plate on Walker's old Ford pickup truck says the year is 1957. The coal mine in an Illinois town is shutting down due to government regulations about sulfur content. So Walker is out of work. Still, Lou Ann, the mother of his children demands child support. Walker takes out all his money from the bank where Audrey works, and he and Audrey eventually date and finally move in together. While Walker is attending a baseball game with his dog Brute, a man observes that Brute is a breed well-suited to fighting. Walker will not let his dog fight. Then Lou Ann insists on going to nursing school, which will cost a great deal of money, and she expects Walker to pay or he will never see his kids again. So Walker does what he has to do. Brute is very good, but Walker is reluctant to keep fighting. However, he needs the money and continues until Brute is killed and he gets arrested for dogfighting. Lou Ann meets Audrey and then abandons them while Walker is in jail, but Walker's friend Chester agrees to take the kids until Walker is free.

Cast
Jason Patric ... Walker Payne
Drea de Matteo ... Lou Ann
KaDee Strickland ... Audrey
Chelsea Lopez ... Sarah
Gabrielle Brennan ... Beth
Bruce Dern ... Chester
Sam Shepard ... Syrus

References
Scheib, Ronnie. "Walker Payne". Variety. May 5, 2006 (in print June 5, 2006).

External links 
 
 

2006 films
2006 drama films
American drama films
Animal cruelty incidents in film
2000s English-language films
2000s American films